Find the Lady is a 1956 British second feature comedy thriller film directed by Charles Saunders and starring Donald Houston, Beverley Brooks and Mervyn Johns.

Plot
During New Year's Eve, a young model spends the day searching for her godmother, who has suspiciously gone missing.

Cast
 Donald Houston - Bill
 Beverley Brooks - June Weston
 Mervyn Johns - Hurst
 Kay Callard - Rita
 Maurice Kaufmann - Nicky
 Edwin Richfield - Max
 Moray Watson - Jimmy
 Ferdy Mayne - Tony Del Roma
 Anne Heywood - Receptionist
 Nigel Green - Photographer

References

External links

1956 films
Films directed by Charles Saunders
1956 comedy films
British comedy films
1950s English-language films
1950s British films
British black-and-white films